Branko Božović (born 21 October 1969) is a Serbian football manager and former player.

Club career
Božović started out with Borac Čačak and played in the Yugoslav Second League for two seasons (1988–89 and 1990–91). He subsequently played for Budućnost Titograd in the 1991–92 Yugoslav First League. Later on, Božović also played indoor soccer in the United States.

International career
At international level, Božović represented Yugoslavia at under-16 and under-21 categories.

Managerial career
After hanging up his boots, Božović served as manager of several clubs in his homeland, including Mladost Lučani, Takovo, and Timočanin. He was also manager of Polet Ljubić on two occasions.

In April 2022, Božović was appointed as manager of Ghana Premier League club King Faisal. He parted ways with them in October of the same year.

Notes

References

External links
 

1969 births
Living people
Sportspeople from Čačak
Yugoslav footballers
Serbia and Montenegro footballers
Serbian footballers
Association football defenders
Yugoslavia under-21 international footballers
FK Borac Čačak players
FK Budućnost Podgorica players
FK Vojvodina players
Ulsan Hyundai FC players
FK Železnik players
Philadelphia KiXX players
FK Sevojno players
First League of Serbia and Montenegro players
K League 1 players
National Professional Soccer League (1984–2001) players
Serbia and Montenegro expatriate footballers
Expatriate footballers in South Korea
Expatriate soccer players in the United States
Serbia and Montenegro expatriate sportspeople in South Korea
Serbia and Montenegro expatriate sportspeople in the United States
Serbian football managers
FK Mladost Lučani managers
Ghana Premier League managers
Serbian expatriate football managers
Expatriate football managers in Angola
Expatriate football managers in China
Expatriate football managers in Ghana
Serbian expatriate sportspeople in Angola
Serbian expatriate sportspeople in China
Serbian expatriate sportspeople in Ghana